Almir Tanjič (born 16 January 1979) is a retired Slovenian football midfielder.

International career
Tanjič has made three appearances for the senior Slovenia national football team.

Clubs
1998–2005: NK Primorje
2005–2008: Enosis Neon Paralimni
2008–2010: AEP Paphos
2010–2011: NK Primorje

References

External links

1979 births
Living people
Slovenian footballers
Slovenia international footballers
Slovenian expatriate footballers
Slovenian PrvaLiga players
Cypriot First Division players
NK Primorje players
Enosis Neon Paralimni FC players
AEP Paphos FC players
Expatriate footballers in Cyprus
Association football defenders